The Big River (Māori name Okopowa, Patu-po, or Patupo) is a river of southern Fiordland, New Zealand, and is one of three rivers of that name in the South Island. It is the main source of Lake Hakapoua and a lower stretch is the lake's  outflow to the sea.

See also
List of rivers of New Zealand

References

Land Information New Zealand - Search for Place Names

Rivers of Fiordland